Lawrence L. Larmore is an American mathematician and theoretical computer scientist. Since 1994 he has been a professor of computer science at the University of Nevada, Las Vegas (UNLV). Larmore developed the package-merge algorithm for the length-limited Huffman coding problem, as well as an algorithm for optimizing paragraph breaking in linear time. He is perhaps best known for his work with competitive analysis of online algorithms, particularly for the k-server problem. His contributions, with his co-author Marek Chrobak, led to the application of T-theory to the server problem.

Larmore earned a Ph.D. in Mathematics in the field of algebraic topology from Northwestern University in 1965. He later earned a second Ph.D., this time in Computer Science, in the field of theoretical computer science from University of California, Irvine. He is a past member of Institute for Advanced Study in Princeton, New Jersey and Gastwissenschaftler (visiting scholar) at the University of Bonn.

Awards
 NSF graduate fellowship (1961)

References

External links
Larmore's entry in the Mathematics Genealogy Project
Professor Larmore's research page
Professor Larmore's Webpage at UNLV

American computer scientists
20th-century American mathematicians
21st-century American mathematicians
University of Nevada, Las Vegas faculty
Academic staff of the University of Bonn
Northwestern University alumni
University of California, Irvine alumni
Living people
Year of birth missing (living people)